Perspectives in Vascular Surgery and Endovascular Therapy was a quarterly peer-reviewed medical journal that covered research in the field of angiology. Its editor-in-chief was Peter Gloviczki (Mayo Medical School). It was established in 1988 and was published by SAGE Publications until December 2013.

Abstracting and indexing 
Perspectives in Vascular Surgery and Endovascular Therapy is abstracted and indexed in CINAHL and MEDLINE.

External links 
 

SAGE Publishing academic journals
English-language journals
Cardiology journals
Quarterly journals
Publications established in 1988